The Stop the War Committee was an anti-war organisation that opposed the Second Boer War. It was formed by William Thomas Stead in 1899. Its president was John Clifford and prominent members included Lloyd George and Keir Hardie. The group was generally seen as pro-Boer.

Against the background of political campaigning for the khaki election of 1900, Stop-The-War distributed millions of posters, cartoons and broadsheets, handing out leaflets to commuters on trains.

Its resolutions were religiously-inspired and utopian in their approach. The Committee united various Nonconformists who held different views in relation to socialism. However, the high moral tone of its pronouncements failed to achieve support from the working class, and provoked stronger antagonism than the more rational approach of the South African Conciliation Committee.

See also
Anti-war
Opposition to the Second Boer War
List of anti-war organizations
List of peace activists

References

Peace organisations based in the United Kingdom
Second Boer War
South Africa–United Kingdom relations
Organizations established in 1899
Anti-war movement